Hărmănești is a commune in Iași County, Western Moldavia, Romania. It is composed of three villages: Boldești, Hărmăneștii Noi and Hărmăneștii Vechi (the commune center). These were part of Todirești Commune until 2004, when they were split off.

References

Communes in Iași County
Localities in Western Moldavia